German is one of the seventeen historic parishes of the Isle of Man.

It is located on the west of the island (part of the traditional North Side division) in the sheading of Glenfaba.

Administratively, part of the historic parish of German is now covered by part of the town of Peel.

Other settlements in the parish include St John's (home of the Tynwald Day ceremony).

Local government
For the purposes of local government, The majority of the area of the historic parish forms a single parish district with Commissioners.

Since 1884, an area in the west of the historic parish of German has been part of the separate town of Peel, with its own town Commissioners.

The Captain of the Parish (since 2015) is Allen Charles Corlett.

Politics
German parish is part of the Glenfaba & Peel constituency, which elects two Members to the House of Keys. Before 2016 the majority of the historic parish was in the Glenfaba constituency, and from 1867 until 2016 Peel formed its own constituency.

Geography
It is a mainly hilly area, apart from a small coastal plain near Peel.

Demographics
The Isle of Man census of 2016 returned a parish population of 966, a decrease of 6% from the figure of 1,024 in 2011. 44 residents (4.3%) were able to read, write, and speak Manx Gaelic at the time of the 2011 census. This compares to 3.2% in 1875.

References 

 Manxnotebook German. Detail about Manx parishes and description of the parish. 
Manxnotebook - German with full description of the parish and photographs 
 Manxnotebook Kirk German Antiquities
 Isle of Man Building Control Districts showing parish boundaries
 Glenology - Manx Glens. An ongoing study of Manx glens, their locations and meanings.

Parishes of the Isle of Man